Shackleton is a village in Mashonaland West province in Zimbabwe.

Populated places in Mashonaland West Province